A sensorium is the apparatus of an organism's perception considered as a whole.

Sensorium may also refer to:

Science and technology
 Sensorium Corporation, a social virtual reality company
 Sensorium (insect), a sensory organ on insect antennae; see, for example, Oxycoryninae
 Sensorium Project, related to the IRCF360 proximity and motion sensor

Arts and entertainment
 The Sensorium, a 1984 4D film
 Sensorium, a 2012 novel by Abha Dawesar
 "Sensorium", a song by Epica from The Phantom Agony

See also
 Sensoria Music & Film Festival, an annual event in Sheffield, England